Calosaturnia is a genus of moths in the family Saturniidae first described by Smith in 1886. The genus is sometimes included in Saturnia.

Species
Calosaturnia albofasciata J.W. Johnson, 1938
Calosaturnia mendocino (Behrens, 1876)
Calosaturnia walterorum Hogue & J.W. Johnson, 1958

References

Saturniinae